Professor Jacob van der Westhuizen was a noted South African academic in the field of Criminology, who published over twenty-five books. In December 1987 he went to the Republic of China (Taiwan) on an Academic exchange program due to his position as the Director of the Institute for Criminology for the University of South Africa.

Works
Jacob van der Westhuizen produced 29 works in 64 publications in 2 languages.
 Criminology: an introduction, by PJ van der Walt, G Cronje, B F Smit and J van der Westhuizen
1988 "Wheels of misfortune : alcohol and drug abuse"
1996 "Forensic criminalistics"
1990 "Security management"
1983 "Portents of violence?" (with Hennie Oosthuizen)
1982 "An introduction to criminological research"

See also
South Africa–Taiwan relations

References

External links

 http://www.bwwsociety.org/journal/archive/criminalbehavior.htm

Academic staff of the University of South Africa
South African criminologists
Year of birth missing
Possibly living people